The Mystery of Betty Bonn is a 1938 German adventure film directed by Robert A. Stemmle and starring Maria Andergast, Theodor Loos and Hans Nielsen. The film was shot at the Babelsberg Studios in Berlin with sets designed by the art directors Wilhelm Depenau and Ludwig Reiber. It was made by the leading German company UFA, based on a novel by Friedrich Lindemann.

Synopsis
A British attorney working on a small island wants to return home to London, but first has to solve a mysterious crime.

Cast

References

Bibliography

External links 
 

1938 films
Films of Nazi Germany
German adventure films
German black-and-white films
1938 adventure films
1930s German-language films
Films directed by Robert A. Stemmle
Films based on German novels
UFA GmbH films
1930s German films
Films shot at Babelsberg Studios